Music in Salzburg is a 1944 German comedy film directed by Herbert Maisch and starring Willy Birgel, Lil Dagover and Hans Nielsen.

The film's sets were designed by the art director Max Mellin. It was partly shot on location in Salzburg.

Cast
 Willy Birgel as Anton Klinger
 Lil Dagover as Ursula Sanden
 Hans Nielsen as Dr. Franz Mädler
 Thea Weis as Elisabeth Häberlin
 Hans Olden as Jeremias Sauer
 Julia Serda as Helene Lohmeier
 Theodor Danegger as Portier Schöberl
 Karl Skraup as Hauptwachtmeister
 Egon von Jordan as Intendanzrat
 Josefine Dora as Köchin
 Joseph Egger as Parkwächter
 Erich Musil as Korner
 Georg Tressler as Paul Zeisig
 Werner Kurz as Huber
 Klara Moll as Zimmermädchen

References

Bibliography 
 Hans-Michael Bock and Tim Bergfelder. The Concise Cinegraph: An Encyclopedia of German Cinema. Berghahn Books, 2009.

External links 
 

1944 films
Films of Nazi Germany
German comedy films
1944 comedy films
1940s German-language films
Films directed by Herbert Maisch
Terra Film films
Films set in Salzburg
German black-and-white films
1940s German films